The Helminthoglyptinae are a subfamily of air-breathing land snails, terrestrial pulmonate gastropod mollusks within the family Xanthonychidae. 

This is a large and diverse group of new world snails, ranging in distribution from Alaska through North America to the West Indies, Central America, and as far south as Argentina.

The shells are typically of medium to large size, with no apertural teeth but usually with a reflected apertural lip.

Anatomy
In the species in this family, the diverticulum may be present or absent. They possess a single dart apparatus with one stylophore (dart sac) and two mucus glands. These snails use the love dart as part of their mating behavior.

In this subfamily, the number of haploid chromosomes lies between 26 and 30 (according to the values in this table).

Taxonomy
The basic nomenclature and taxonomy of this large and complex subfamily of land snails has been the subject of many modifications, and the list of genera given here is applicable only when the subfamily is broadly interpreted. Many of these snail genera have been placed by various authors in more restrictively defined families, such as: Cepolidae, Epiphragmophoridae, Humboldtianidae, Monadeniidae, and Xanthonychidae.

Tribes in the subfamily Helminthoglyptinae include (according to the taxonomy of the Gastropoda by Bouchet & Rocroi, 2005):

tribe Helminthoglyptini Pilsbry, 1939
subtribe Helminthoglyptina Pilsbry, 1939: the mucus glands lie adjacent to the vagina or to the sheath of the dart apparatus; the ducts of the glands are provided with bulbous reservoirs.
subtribe Micrariontina Schileyko, 1991: the mucus glands  lie adjacent  to  the dart  sac;  in  part  the dart apparatus is missing.
tribe Sonorelicini Roth, 1996
Subfamily Sonorellinae Pilsbry, 1939: the diverticulum and the dart apparatus are absent.

Genera
ITIS listed 16 genera under Helminthoglyptidae.WoRMS added the two genera Greggelix and Micrarionta, as well as dividing the subfamily into two tribes.They are listed below:
 Helminthoglyptini Pilsbry, 1939
 Cahuillus B. Roth, 1996
 Chamaearionta S.S. Berry, 1930
 Eremarionta Pilsbry, 1913
 Eremariontoides W.B. Miller, 1981
 Greggelix W.B. Miller, 1972
 Helminthoglypta Ancey, 1887 - type genus of the family Helminthoglyptidae and subtribe Helminthoglyptina
 Herpeteros Berry, 1947
 Micrarionta Ancey, 1880 - type genus of the subtribe Micrariontina
 Martirelix W.B. Miller, 1982
 Noyo Roth, 1996
 Plesarionta Pilsbry, 1939
 Rothelix Miller, 1985
 Sonorelix Berry, 1943 - was listed as type genus of the tribe Sonorelicini
 Xerarionta Pilsbry, 1913
 Sonorellini Pilsbry, 1939
 Maricopella Roth, 1996
 Mohavelix Berry, 1943
 Myotophallus Pilsbry, 1939
 Sonorella Pilsbry, 1900 - was listed as type genus of the subfamily Sonorellinae (now Sonorellini)

Genera listed below has an unknown origin:
 Averellia Ancey, 1887
 Cepolis Montfort, 1810
 Dialeuca Albers, 1850
 Hemitrochus Swainson, 1840
 Humboldtiana Ihering, 1892
 Leptarionta Fischer & Crosse, 1872
 Polymita Beck, 1837
 Setipellis Pilsbry, 1926
 Tryonigens Pilsbry, 1927

The taxon listed below was moved into another taxon:
 Xanthonyx Crosse & Fischer, 1867: Now under Xanthonychidae.

References

External links